Captain Cook und seine singenden Saxophone are a German schlager instrumental group founded in 1993. The band covers German pop songs and German language versions of English hits, such as "Rote Lippen Soll Man Küssen", originally by Cliff Richard.

Providing music for Andrea and Manuela singing

They have provided music as Andrea and Manuela, a duet, sang.

Discography

 Captain Cook und seine singenden Saxophone (November 1993, Electrola (EMI))
 Traummelodien Folge 02 (February 1995, Electrola (EMI))
 Wenn die Sehnsucht nicht wär' (1999, Koch Universal)
 Der weiße Mond von Maratonga (May 2003, Koch Universal)
 Bist du einsam heut Nacht (September 2004, Koch Universal)
 Ich denk' so gern an Billy Vaughn (February 2005, Koch Universal)
 Du bist mein erster Gedanke (May 2005, Koch Universal)
 Tanze mit mir in den Morgen (August 2006, Koch Universal)
 White Christmas (November 2006, Koch Universal)
 Mandolinen und Mondschein (June 2007, Koch Universal)
 Du bist nicht allein (May 2008, Koch Universal)
 Da tanzten wir zu Billy Vaughn (October 2008, Koch Universal)
 Steig in das Traumboot der Liebe (DVD, November 2008, Koch Universal)
 Ein bisschen Spaß muss sein (June 2009, Ariola)
 Nachts in Rom (August 2010, Ariola)
 Heimweh (November 2010, D-One (Delta Music))
 Sentimental Journey (2012)
 Dieter Thomas Heck präsentiert: 20 Jahre Captain Cook und seine singenden Saxophone – die deutsche Schlagerhitparade (2013)
 Die große Westernparty (August 2014)
 Das große Wunschkonzert (March 2015)
 Wie ein Stern (2015)
 Komm ein bisschen mit nach Italien (May 2016)
 25 Jahre (February 2018)

References

German musical groups